Jamnia may refer to:

 Council of Jamnia, a hypothetical Jewish council in the 1st century CE
 Jamnia Jagir, a former estate in the Bhopawar Agency of British India
 Jamnith (Jamnia), a ruin in Upper Galilee
 Yibna, a former village known in Roman sources as Jamnia
 Yavne, a city in the Central District of Israel that occupies the site of the village